Tazehnab-e Olya (also Romanized as Tāzehnāb-e ‘Olyā and Tāzeh Nāb-e ‘Olya; also known as Tāzeh Nāb-e Bālā, Tāznāb, Tāznāb-e Bālā, and Tāznāb-e ‘Olyā) is a village in Shaban Rural District, in the Central District of Nahavand County, Hamadan Province, Iran. At the 2006 census, its population was 296, in 79 families.

References 

Populated places in Nahavand County